Erick Rowsell (born 29 July 1990) is a British former professional road racing cyclist, who rode professionally between 2012 and 2019 for the , , and  teams. He now works as the Elite Road Racing Manager for British Cycling, having previously been a member of their Olympic Development Programme as an endurance rider.

Career
He won the junior race at the 2007 British National Time Trial Championships in an upset of world champion Peter Kennaugh. The following year, he won the junior race at the British National Road Race Championships.

Having won the prologue time trial of the Junior Tour of Wales in 2008, Rowsell won the three-day event – joining previous winners such as Charly Wegelius and Geraint Thomas – by eight seconds from Norwegian Johan Fredrik Ziesler of the Nymark team.

In November 2014  announced that Rowsell would be part of the team's line-up for the 2015 season.

Personal life
His older sister Joanna Rowsell also competed professionally as a road and track cyclist.

Major results

2007
 National Junior Road Championships
1st  Time trial
3rd Road race
 2nd Overall Junior Tour of Wales
 3rd Individual pursuit, National Junior Track Championships
2008
 1st  Road race, National Junior Road Championships
 1st  Overall Junior Tour of Wales
1st Stage 1
 2nd  Team pursuit, UEC European Junior Track Championships
 2nd Overall Driedaagse van Axel
 3rd Points race, National Junior Track Championships
 3rd Overall Tour du Pays de Vaud Juniors
2009
 2nd  Team pursuit, UEC European Under-23 Track Championships
2010
 3rd Madison, National Track Championships (with George Atkins)
2011
 2nd  Team pursuit, UEC European Under-23 Track Championships
 3rd  Team pursuit, 2010–11 UCI Track Cycling World Cup Classics, Beijing
 3rd Road race, National Under-23 Road Championships
2012
 2nd Overall Tour Doon Hame
1st Stage 1
 6th Overall Tour Alsace
 7th Overall Tour de Normandie
1st Stage 5
 7th Overall Tour de Bretagne
2014
 5th Dwars door Drenthe
2015
 1st  Overall Tour of the Reservoir
1st Stage 1
 8th Overall Tour de Yorkshire
2018
 5th Rutland–Melton CiCLE Classic

References

External links

English male cyclists
1990 births
Living people
Cyclists at the 2010 Commonwealth Games
People from Cheam
Commonwealth Games competitors for England